The  Dallas Cowboys season was the franchise's 56th season in the National Football League (NFL), the seventh playing their home games at AT&T Stadium and the fifth full season under head coach Jason Garrett. The team finished the regular season at 4–12. It was the team's worst record since 1989, when they went 1–15. Despite starting 2–0, they would struggle immensely. Key injuries, including starting quarterback Tony Romo were factors in their struggles of the season. They were eliminated from playoff contention with their Week 15 loss to the New York Jets. This would be the last losing season for the Cowboys until 2020.

2015 draft class

Notes
 The Cowboys traded their sixth-round selection (No. 204 overall) to the Baltimore Ravens in exchange for the Ravens' seventh-round selection (No. 243 overall) and linebacker Rolando McClain.
 The Cowboys traded their original seventh-round selection (No. 244 overall) to the Indianapolis Colts in exchange for defensive end Caesar Rayford.
 The Cowboys acquired an additional seventh-round selection (No. 236 overall) in a trade that sent defensive tackle Sean Lissemore to the San Diego Chargers.
 Dallas acquired another additional seventh-round selection (No. 246 overall) in exchange for their sixth-round pick in 2016.

Offseason

Staff transactions
 Head coach Jason Garrett remains head coach signing a five-year $30 million contract
 Defensive coordinator Rod Marinelli resigned to a three-year contract

Players transactions
 Resigned wide receiver Dez Bryant to a five-year $70 million contract
 Resigned right tackle Doug Free to a three-year contract
 RB Demarco Murray departed signing a five-year contract with the Philadelphia Eagles

Regular season
Despite starting the season 2-0 and leading the NFC East, the Cowboys lost their next seven games and finished the season by going 2-12 in their final 14 games.  They were eliminated from playoff contention following a loss to the NY Jets in week 15.  Their collapse from a solid start was primarily due to injuries by starting quarterback Tony Romo and starting wide receiver Dez Bryant.  Bryant broke a bone in his foot during the week 1 win against the Giants, and Romo suffered a broken clavicle in the week 2 triumph at Philadelphia.  Brandon Weeden started the next 3 games in which the team lost, and then was benched in week 7 following the bye week in replacement for Matt Cassel who was acquired via trade from the Buffalo Bills following Romo's injury.  The Cowboys, with Cassell at the helm, lost their next 4 games. Tony Romo, not fully recovered from his broken collarbone injury, started the next game against the Dolphins, which they won.  However, in a week 12 loss against the undefeated Panthers, Romo suffered a second collarbone injury and was later ruled out for the season.  Matt Cassel then started the next 3 games for the Cowboys with a week 13 win against the rival Redskins.  However, after a poor performance against the New York Jets in week 15 in the 1st half, Cassel was benched in favor of backup Kellen Moore, and the team went on to lose the rest of the games of the season.

Staff

Rosters

Opening preseason roster

Week one roster

Final roster

Schedule

Preseason

Regular season

Note: Intra-division opponents are in bold text.

Game summaries

Week 1: vs. New York Giants

The Cowboys opened the season at home against their rival, the New York Giants, led by the quarterback-receiver tandem of Eli Manning and young Odell Beckham Jr.

Tony Romo came back late in the fourth quarter and nailed the game-winning drive to Jason Witten to give Dallas a narrow 27-26 victory.

The victory, however, was bittersweet as Dez Bryant broke his foot in the second half. The injury required surgery and he was expected to miss 10–12 weeks. Cameras caught Bryant congratulating his teammates in the locker room after a close victory. Romo spoke on Bryant's injury: "You can't replace Dez Bryant." Three days later, the NFL came forward and apologized to the Giants for 2 blown calls. The first call led to a Cowboys touchdown due to a wrong pass interference call which set up the Cowboys on 1st and Goal on the 2 yard line, and the second was a blown defensive holding call which would have set up the Giants on first and goal with the Cowboys having no timeouts remaining and 1:36 left on the clock.

Week 2: at Philadelphia Eagles

Shining atop the division, the Cowboys played their divisional rivals, the Philadelphia Eagles in what turned out to be a defensive juggernaut of a game. Neither team could really get anything going on offense; however, the Cowboys were able to pull away by dominating the time of possession. Already missing starting wide receiver Dez Bryant, the Cowboys experienced a devastating loss when Tony Romo was sacked by Jordan Hicks. The result of the hit was a fractured collarbone and an expected eight-week absence. The fractured collarbone is the same one Romo broke in 2010. Backup Brandon Weeden got his first taste of game time this season, completing all of his 7 passes for a total of 73 yards and one touchdown. Despite the injuries to the two key players, the Cowboys still managed to hold off the Eagles with a 20-10 victory, ultimately stunning Philadelphia's home crowd. Dallas's defense harassed Sam Bradford and ex-Cowboy DeMarco Murray all game, holding Murray to a measly 2 yards on 13 carries. Sean Lee, a defensive powerhouse, finished the game with 14 tackles and an interception for the Cowboys. For his performance, Lee was given the honor of being named NFC Defensive Player of the Week.

Week 3: vs. Atlanta Falcons

Many questions surrounded the Dallas Cowboys as they entered Week 3, especially regarding how the team would respond to having neither Dez Bryant nor Tony Romo. Coach Jason Garrett's mantra of “next man up” played a big part in preparing for the game against the Atlanta Falcons.

Backup quarterback Brandon Weeden started for the first time since the previous season's game against the Arizona Cardinals, completing 22 of 26 passes for 232 yards and one interception with no touchdowns.

The Cowboys played very well in the first half, outscoring the Falcons 28-17; however, the Falcons made a few halftime adjustments that squashed any running game the Cowboys pursued afterwards. On the other hand, the Cowboys had no answer for Julio Jones, who caught for 164 yards and 2 touchdowns. Owner Jerry Jones said after the game that the Cowboys just looked tired in the second half. The Falcons eventually came back late in the second half and won the game 39-28.

Week 4: at New Orleans Saints

In another heartbreaking loss which ended a 9-0 winning streak of regular season away games, the injury bug struck the Cowboys again. Sean Lee exited the game early with a concussion, Lance Dunbar saw the last of his playing time this season with a torn ACL, and Brice Butler injured his hamstring. Despite all the injuries, the Cowboys were able to stay neck and neck with the New Orleans Saints.

Enduring a few lead changes throughout the first four quarters, the Cowboys were able to come back and tie it up 20-20 with a last minute touchdown from Brandon Weeden (16/26; 246 yards; 1 TD) to Terrance Williams. However, the Cowboys defense was not able to hold off the Saints during overtime. An 80-yard touchdown was scored within the first 13 seconds of overtime, which handed the Cowboys their second loss of the season.

Week 5: vs. New England Patriots

After back-to-back losses, Dallas returned home to face the then-undefeated Super Bowl champions, the New England Patriots.

Stout early defensive efforts kept the game close, including five sacks of Patriots quarterback Tom Brady, but Dallas's offense could never produce steady results. Dallas QB Brandon Weeden (1 INT) and the offensive line were ineffectual, gaining only 264 yards total offense and making 18 1st downs. The offense could manage only two Dan Bailey field goals.

During the first quarter, the Cowboys held the Patriots to a field goal. However, the Patriots slowly but surely pulled away afterwards for the 30-6 victory, handing Dallas the loss and a 2-3 record entering the bye week - and handing Cowboys head coach Jason Garrett his first career three-game losing streak.

Week 7: at New York Giants

Dallas took its perfect record in games against NFC East opponents to  MetLife Stadium to face the New York Giants, and despite limiting a highly efficient Giants offense and Cassel making some clutch throws, The Giants dominance of the turnover margin and special teams spelled doom for the Cowboys as the Giants left with the 27-20 win.

Matt Cassel made his starting quarterback debut for Dallas passing for 227 yards and 1 touchdown, but his 3 interceptions - including one returned for a touchdown - led to ten Giants points. On the ground Dallas had consistent success all day with Darren McFadden substituting for mysteriously injured starter Joseph Randle and the offense accumulated 460 total yards vs. the Giants' 289.

Despite sloppy, penalty-ridden play helping enable three lead changes Dallas was able to tie the game at 20 when Cassel threw a beauty on a 25-yard touchdown pass to Devin Street who had an even better catch, tapping his feet inches from the end line. However, the Giants returned the ensuing kickoff for a touchdown, immediately regaining the lead. Later, a quick "three and out" by the Giants' offense preceded a Giants punt which was fumbled by Cole Beasley and recovered by the Giants, who then ran out the clock on subsequent "kneel downs" to finish the game.

The loss hands Dallas a four-game losing skid heading back home to face the defending NFC champion Seattle Seahawks.

Week 8: vs. Seattle Seahawks
This game involved a scary moment, after Seattle's  Ricardo Lockette was hit by Dallas's Jeff Heath during a kick return. He lied on the ground, motionless, for about 7 minutes before he was taken off the field on a cart. X-rays later revealed that Lockette had a broken neck, which turned out to be a career-ending injury.

The Cowboys would only kick field goals in this game, as Dan Bailey was 4 for 4 on field goals. Dallas led 12-10 with under 2 minutes to go. However, the Seahawks would march down the field and take a 13-12 lead after Steven Hauschka drilled a 24-yard field goal of his own. Dallas tried to come back, but Seattle forced a turnover on downs to end the game.

With their 5th straight loss, the Cowboys fell to 2-5.

Week 9: vs. Philadelphia Eagles
The Cowboys would rally to tie the game after Dan Bailey converted a 44 yard field goal that caromed off the uprights with 2 seconds left. The Eagles would get the ball first, and would move down the field. During the drive, the Eagles faced a 4th and 1, and decided to go for it. Ryan Mathews would get the ball, but he would fumble on the play, and the Cowboys appeared to recover. However, the play was reviewed, and review showed that Mathews's knee was down prior to the ball coming out. The Eagles got another chance. On the next play, Sam Bradford found Jordan Matthews on a 41-yard touchdown reception to end the game.

With the loss, the Cowboys fell to 2-6.

Week 10: at Tampa Bay Buccaneers
The Cowboys would manage only 2 field goals during this game, as they lost to Tampa Bay 10-6. Jameis Winston would run the ball in from a yard out to give the Buccaneers the lead for good with 54 seconds left. The Cowboys tried to rally, but quarterback Matt Cassel's deep pass into Buccaneers territory would end up getting intercepted, sealing the Cowboys' seventh straight defeat.

With the loss, the Cowboys fell to 2-7. They became the first team since the 2013 Texans to lose seven consecutive games after a 2-0 start.

Week 11: at Miami Dolphins
Dallas would finally break their 7 game losing streak with a 24-14 win over the Dolphins. Tony Romo returned to action after missing 7 weeks with a collarbone injury. He would have a fine return, as he would throw 2 touchdown passes along with 2 interceptions in the win. He would also throw for 227 yards during the game.

With the win, the Cowboys improved to 3-7.

Week 12: vs. Carolina Panthers
Thanksgiving Day game
Tony Romo would play at quarterback for the second straight week. However, he would get injured again, as he would suffer a clavicle injury at the end of the 3rd quarter while being sacked by Thomas Davis. Romo would throw 3 interceptions and no touchdowns as the Cowboys were rattled at home to the undefeated Panthers, 33-14.

It was later revealed that Romo would miss the rest of the season with a broken clavicle. This would be Romo's last NFL game until Week 17 of the 2016 NFL Season, as he would lose his starting job to 2016 rookie Dak Prescott after a pre-season back injury that would sideline him for the first 10 weeks of the season.

With the crushing loss, the Cowboys fell to 3-8.

Week 13: at Washington Redskins
The Cowboys would get an upset win over the Washington Redskins on Monday Night Football. The game was mostly contested with field goals, until the end of the 4th quarter. DeSean Jackson would fumble a punt return with 1:31 remaining on the clock, which was recovered by Dallas. The Cowboys would take the lead after Darren McFadden took it in from 6 yards out to give them a 16-9 lead. On the ensuing kickoff, Washington got a good return from Rashad Ross that put the Redskins in Dallas territory. Washington would score soon afterwards, with DeSean Jackson catching a 28-yard touchdown pass from Kirk Cousins to tie the game at 16. However, the Cowboys would march down the field in response and Dan Bailey would end the game by kicking a 54 yard field goal with 9 seconds left.

With the win, the Cowboys improved to 4-8 and remained in the playoff hunt, aided by the fact that all four NFC East teams had losing records.

Week 14: at Green Bay Packers

The Cowboys traveled to Lambeau Field to take on the Packers in a rematch of last season's Divisional Round, in which Green Bay narrowly won after Dez Bryant's controversial catch was overturned, allowing the Packers to advance to the NFC Championship game.

This time, with no Tony Romo leading the Cowboys, Green Bay won handily by 28-7, which dropped the Cowboys' record to 4-9.

Week 15: vs. New York Jets
The Cowboys came into this game needing a win to remain in the playoff hunt. However, they had to go through a hot Jets team for it. Towards the end of the game, Jets quarterback Ryan Fitzpatrick would sneak the ball across for a first down deep in his own territory. However, the replay showed that the ball might have come out as he was sneaking over the line. The play was reviewed, but the call stood, and the Jets kept the ball. The Jets would eventually march down the field. Randy Bullock would give the Jets a 19-16 lead with 36 seconds left. The Cowboys would try to go down the field with Kellen Moore at the quarterback spot. However, one of his passes would be intercepted by Darrelle Revis, ending the game.

With the loss, Dallas fell to 4-10 and was mathematically eliminated from playoff contention.

Week 16: at Buffalo Bills
The Cowboys managed only 2 field goals from Dan Bailey, as they lost 6-16 to Buffalo. Kellen Moore would start for the Cowboys again, as Matt Cassel was benched.

With the loss, the Cowboys fell to 4-11.

Week 17: vs. Washington Redskins
The Cowboys would trail 0-24 by the second quarter, and despite an attempt to come back, they would go on to lose 23-34 to the NFC East Champions Redskins.

With the loss, the Cowboys ended their season with a frustrating record of 4-12. They also finished 1-7 at home, their worst home record since 1989.

Standings

Division

Conference

References

External links
 
 

Dallas
Dallas Cowboys seasons
Dallas Cowboys
2010s in Dallas
2015 in Texas